William John Grayson (November 2, 1788 – October 4, 1863) was a U.S. Representative from South Carolina. He was also a poet.

Biography
Born in Beaufort, South Carolina, Grayson pursued classical studies, and was graduated from South Carolina College at Columbia in 1809, where he was a member of the Clariosophic Society. He then studied law and was admitted to the bar in 1822. He became a practicing lawyer in Beaufort, South Carolina.

He served as member of the State House of Representatives from 1813 to 1815 and 1822 to 1825 and in the State Senate 1826 to 1831. Grayson was elected commissioner in equity for Beaufort District in 1831 and resigned from the senate.

He was elected as a Nullifier to the Twenty-third and Twenty-fourth Congresses (March 4, 1833 – March 3, 1837). He then served as collector of customs at Charleston from August 9, 1841, to March 19, 1853. After his term as collector of customs, he retired to his plantation. He was a frequent contributor to the Southern Quarterly Review]'.

The Oxford English Dictionary credits William J. Grayson with having first used the phrase "master race" in his poem "The Hireling and the Slave" (1855); the phrase denotes the relation between the white masters and black slaves:

For these great ends hath Heaven’s supreme command
Brought the black savage from his native land,
Trains for each purpose his barbarian mind,
By slavery tamed, enlightened, and refined;
Instructs him, from a master-race, to draw
Wise modes of polity and forms of law,
Imbues his soul with faith, his heart with love,
Shapes all his life by dictates from above.

Death
He died in Newberry, South Carolina, on October 4, 1863, and was interred in Magnolia Cemetery, Charleston, South Carolina.

BibliographyThe Hireling and the Slave, Chicora, and Other Poems'' (1856)

References

External links
Full text of The Hireling and the Slave, Chicora, and Other Poems

1788 births
1863 deaths
People from Beaufort, South Carolina
Members of the United States House of Representatives from South Carolina
Nullifier Party members of the United States House of Representatives
Nullifier Party politicians
American male poets
19th-century American politicians
Burials at Magnolia Cemetery (Charleston, South Carolina)